The 1970–71 Cypriot Second Division was the 16th season of the Cypriot second-level football league. APOP Paphos FC won their 2nd title.

Format
Twelve teams participated in the 1970–71 Cypriot Second Division. All teams played against each other twice, once at their home and once away. The team with the most points at the end of the season crowned champions. The first team was  promoted to 1971–72 Cypriot First Division. The last team was relegated to the 1971–72 Cypriot Third Division.

Changes from previous season
Teams promoted to 1970–71 Cypriot First Division
Digenis Akritas Morphou FC

Teams relegated to 1970–71 Cypriot Third Division
Achilleas Kaimakli FC
Keravnos Strovolou FC
Apollon Athienou
Anagennisi Larnacas

Teams relegated from 1969–70 Cypriot First Division
Aris Limassol FC

Moreover, Arion Lemesou merged with Apollon Limassol.

League standings

See also
 Cypriot Second Division
 1970–71 Cypriot First Division
 1970–71 Cypriot Cup

References

Cypriot Second Division seasons
Cyprus
1970–71 in Cypriot football